Ray is an Indian anthology drama streaming series on Netflix created by Sayantan Mukherjee, based on the works of Satyajit Ray. The series is directed by Srijit Mukherji, Vasan Bala and Abhishek Chaubey. It is produced by Ajit Andhare, Tipping point and Viacom18 Studios. The series features Manoj Bajpayee, Ali Fazal, Harshvardhan Kapoor and Kay Kay Menon in the lead roles.  The series was released on 25 June 2021 on Netflix.

Synopsis
The four stories included as part of the anthology are:
 Forget Me Not by Srijit Mukherji: Based on Ray's short story Bipin Chowdhury'r Smritibhrom It is about a successful entrepreneur, Ipsit Rama Nair (Ali Fazal) and an event, which changes the way his life was previously.
 Bahrupiya by Srijit Mukherji: Based on Ray's short story Bahurupi It is about Indrashish (Kay Kay Menon), an office employee who gets hold of a valuable book on the art of prosthetics passed down to him by his grandmother.
 Hungama Hai Kyon Barpa by Abhishek Chaubey: Based on Ray's short story Barin Bhowmick-er Byaram It is about two people - one being Musafir Ali (Manoj Bajpayee), a popular musician and singer and the other being Aslam Baig (Gajraj Rao), a wrestler turned sports journalist who meet on a train journey and a much earlier link between them reopens.
 Spotlight by Vasan Bala: Based on Ray's eponymous short story It revolves around a celebrated actor, Vikram "Vik" Arora (Harshvardhan Kapoor), who is known for a particular trademark look and a kind of existential crisis that he goes through when he meets a godlike figure known as Didi. It may be considered as a simulatenous adaptation of two most renowned films directed by Satyajit Ray viz., Mahapurush o Kapurush (Didi's character) and Nayak (Vik's character). Mahapurush was actually an adaptation of the Rajshekhar Basu's short story Birinchibaba.

Cast
The cast of the anthology includes the following:

Release
The trailer of the series was released on 8 June 2021. The series released on 25 June 2021 on Netflix.

Reception
The Daily Star wrote that "if not associated with Satyajit Ray's name, the series would most likely have garnered a better score for its entertainment value alone." Shreya Paul of Firstpost stated, "In an attempt to intellectualise Satyajit Ray through a contemporary lens, Netflix India's Ray completely alienates his humanism and effortlessness in portraying people’s vulnerabilities." Taisa Bhowal from India Today wrote, "There couldn't have been a better way to celebrate Satyajit Ray's birth anniversary than to introduce the prolific filmmaker-writer to an entire generation that is perhaps unversed with his legacy."

Koimoi's Umesh Punwani reviewed the series positively saying "Ray is probably the best thing to come out of India’s OTT space. A must watch for those who haven’t followed Satyajit Ray as well. This serves as bait to invite people to the ethereal world of Ray!"

Avinash Singh of Live Hindustan praised the performance of the cast, stating "The length of 'Ray' is a bit jarring, but the endings of the stories are good and the actors are also able to hook you till the end of the story."

Hindustan Times's Rohan Naahar wrote "Manoj Bajpayee, Harsh Varrdhan Kapoor, Ali Fazal and Radhika Madan lead a handful of excellent performers in Netflix's irreverent but inconsistent anthology, based on Satyajit Ray's short stories."

References

External links
 

2020s Indian television series
Anthology web series
2021 web series debuts
Hindi-language Netflix original programming